Autonomous church may refer to:

 A self-governed church
 Sui iuris, groups in Catholicism
 Autonomy (Eastern Orthodoxy)

See also 
 Autocephaly